The Jacksonville, IL Micropolitan Statistical Area, as defined by the United States Census Bureau, is an area consisting of two counties in west central Illinois, anchored by the city of Jacksonville.

As of the 2000 census, the μSA had a population of 42,153 (though a July 1, 2009 estimate placed the population at 40,090).

Counties
Morgan
Scott

Communities
Places with more than 10,000 inhabitants
Jacksonville (Principal city)
Places with 1,000 to 5,000 inhabitants
Meredosia
South Jacksonville
Waverly
Winchester
Places with 500 to 1,000 inhabitants
Bluffs
Chapin
Franklin
Murrayville
Woodson
Places with less than 500 inhabitants
Alsey
Concord
Exeter
Glasgow
Lynnville
Manchester 
Naples
Unincorporated places
Alexander
Arcadia
Arnold
Clements
Literberry
Merritt
Nortonville
Pisgah
Rees
Riggston
Sinclair
Sweet Water

Demographics
As of the census of 2000, there were 42,153 people, 16,261 households, and 10,813 families residing within the μSA. The racial makeup of the μSA was 93.27% White, 4.66% African American, 0.18% Native American, 0.42% Asian, 0.01% Pacific Islander, 0.61% from other races, and 0.85% from two or more races. Hispanic or Latino of any race were 1.20% of the population.

The median income for a household in the μSA was $36,750, and the median income for a family was $44,482. Males had a median income of $30,659 versus $22,280 for females. The per capita income for the μSA was $17,602.

See also
Illinois statistical areas

References

 
Micropolitan areas of Illinois
Geography of Morgan County, Illinois
Geography of Scott County, Illinois